Jerzy Józef Wiatr (born 17 September 1931 in Warsaw) is a Polish sociologist, political scientist and politician. Professor of the University of Warsaw, Chairman of the European School of Law and Administration rector of a private tertiary education institution in Warsaw. Member of the Polish United Workers Party, he supported the party's line in communist-era Poland. In post-communist Poland, member of the leftist parties (Democratic Left Alliance), deputy to Polish parliament (Sejm) from 1991 to 1997. Minister of National Education 1996–1997.

Received the Commander's Cross with Star of the Polonia Restituta order in 1996.

Works 
 Naród i państwo: socjologiczne problemy kwestii narodowej (KiW, 1969)
 Socjologia stosunków politycznych (PWN, 1977)
 Społeczeństwo. Wstęp do socjologii systematycznej (PWN, 1979)
 Drogi do wolności: polityczne mechanizmy rozwoju krajów postkolonialnych (IPM-L KC PZPR, 1982)
 Socjologia wojska (MON, 1982)
 Marksistowska teoria rozwoju społecznego (PWN, 1983)
 Marksizm i polityka (Biblioteka Studiów nad Marksizmem, KiW, 1987)
 Socjologia wielkiej przemiany (KAP, 1999)
 Socjaldemokracja wobec wyzwań XXI wieku (Scholar, 2000)
 Socjologia polityki (Scholar, 2002)
 Refleksje o polskim interesie narodowym (IFiS PAN, 2004)
 Europa pokomunistyczna – przemiany państw i społeczeństw po 1989 roku (Scholar, 2006)

References

1931 births
Living people
Polish political scientists
Polish sociologists
Polish communists
Democratic Left Alliance politicians
Members of the Polish Sejm 1991–1993
Members of the Polish Sejm 1993–1997
Members of the Polish Sejm 1997–2001
Commanders with Star of the Order of Polonia Restituta
University of Warsaw alumni
Academic staff of the University of Warsaw
Education ministers of Poland
Politicians from Warsaw